Wang Tengda (born 18 February 2001) is a Chinese footballer who currently plays for Chinese Super League side Dalian Professional.

Club career
Wang Tengda started his football career with the Dalian Yifang youth team in 2019. In 2021, he was promoted to Dalian Professionals (previously Dalian Yifang) first team squad. He would make his professional debut in a Chinese FA Cup game on 29 October 2021 against Shanghai Port F.C. in a match that ended in a 0-0 draw. In the following season on 4 June 2022, he made his first Chinese Super League appearance against Henan Songshan Longmen in a game that ended in 2-2 draw.

Career statistics
.

References

External links
 

2001 births
Living people
Chinese footballers
Footballers from Dalian
Dalian Professional F.C. players
Chinese Super League players
Association football midfielders